Garber High School is a public high school serving grades 9–12 located in Essexville, Michigan. It lies within the Essexville-Hampton school district in Bay County. It is located adjacent to Cramer Junior High School.

History
Garber High School opened for classes in the fall of 1964 and was dedicated in 1965. The school was built on farm property acquired from the Garber family. The Garber farm was founded by John and Melissa Garber in the 1800s. The farm was passed on to Otto Garber and his wife Mabel. In addition to farming, Otto Garber was a president in the village of Essexville. Garber sold the land to the district in the early 1960s.

Campus
Garber has five computer labs, including a 'MacIntosh' lab, designed for a variety of applications from computer assisted drafting and design to accounting. The Mac Lab was removed in the 2010s. The building also features a state of the art technology hall with a rear projection screen. As with other buildings in the district, Garber added technology to all classrooms and the media center with the passage of the bond issue in 1997.

Demographics 
The demographic breakdown of the students enrolled in 2021-22 was:

 Male - 48.9%
 Female - 51.1%
 American Indian/Alaska Native - 0%
 Asian- 0.7%
 Black - 1.2%
 Hispanic - 4.5%
 Native Hawaiian/Pacific Islander - 0%
 White - 91.3%
 Multiracial - 2.1%

20.03% of the students were eligible for free or reduced-cost lunch.

References

External links

Public high schools in Michigan
Schools in Bay County, Michigan
Educational institutions established in 1964
1964 establishments in Michigan